was a  after Kōhō and before Tenroku. This period spanned the years from August 968 through March 970.

Change of era
 February 2, 968 : The new era name was created to mark an event or series of events. The previous era ended and the new one commenced in Kōhō 4, on the 15th day of the 8th month of 968.

Events of the Anna era
 October 26, 968 (Anna 1, 26th day of the 10th month): A child who would become Emperor Kazan is born in the house of the man who would become Emperor Ichijō.
 September 27, 969 (Anna 2, 13th day of the 8th month):  was appointed sesshō (regent). 
 969 (Anna 2, 10th month): The sadaijin  died.
 969 (Anna 2, 12th month): The sesshō Saneyori celebrated his 70th birthday.
 969 (Anna 2): The "Anna Incident" (Anna no hen)

Notes

References
 Brown, Delmer M. and Ichirō Ishida, eds. (1979).  Gukanshō: The Future and the Past. Berkeley: University of California Press. ;  OCLC 251325323
 Nussbaum, Louis-Frédéric and Käthe Roth. (2005).  Japan encyclopedia. Cambridge: Harvard University Press. ;  OCLC 58053128
 Titsingh, Isaac. (1834). Nihon Ōdai Ichiran; ou,  Annales des empereurs du Japon.  Paris: Royal Asiatic Society, Oriental Translation Fund of Great Britain and Ireland. OCLC 5850691
 Varley, H. Paul. (1980). A Chronicle of Gods and Sovereigns: Jinnō Shōtōki of Kitabatake Chikafusa. New York: Columbia University Press. ;  OCLC 6042764

External links
 National Diet Library, "The Japanese Calendar" -- historical overview plus illustrative images from library's collection

Japanese eras